The Democratic Coalition Party (DKP) was a centre-left party in Hungary between 1990 and 2001.

History
The DKP was founded in August 1990 as the legal successor of the Patriotic Electoral Coalition (HVK). However, the party tried to distance itself from the predecessor organization. The DKP considered itself as a Christian socialist centre-left party with social democratic values. The party also placed great emphasis on the enforcement of the freedom of the press, while supporting the emergence of private farms but rejected the Independent Smallholders' Party's proposal of re-privatization. The first leader of the party was lawyer Zoltán Új, he was replaced by Sándor Forrai on 18 May 1991. Forrai died in office on 27 April 1992, so he was succeeded by István György. In February 1993, Mihály Hesz and his supporters left the party to re-establish the HVK, however the court did not recognize that step. Hesz was officially excluded from the DKP.

The Democratic Coalition Party contested the 1994 parliamentary election with four individual candidates, who received 0.04 percent of the votes, gaining no seats. The DKP did not contest any further elections, it was dissolved on 1 September 2001.

Election results

National Assembly

References

Defunct political parties in Hungary
Political parties established in 1990
Political parties disestablished in 2001
1990 establishments in Hungary
2001 disestablishments in Hungary
Christian socialist organizations